Ceramium pallidum is a small marine alga. It occurs in waters off of Europe and Africa (Morocco).

Description
Ceramium pallidum is a small filamentous, regularly branched delicate alga. The axes can reach 12 cm long and are attached by multicellular rhizoids. The structure is basically of a monosiphonous axis and erect branches with strongly inrolled apices. The segments are either fully corticate or ecorticate at the internodes which gives a banded appearance.

Reproduction
The gametophytes are dioecious or monoecious. Spermatangial sori occur on young axes and cystocarps contain numerous carposporangia. The tetrasporangia occur in whorls on the younger branches.

Habitat
Epiphytic on other algae in the littoral zone as well as the sublittoral.

Distribution
Recorded from the coasts of Great Britain, Ireland, France, the Netherlands, Norway, Portogal, Spain (including the Canary Islands), and Morocco.

References

pallidum